During the 2003-04 season Parma Associazione Calcio competed in Serie A, Coppa Italia and UEFA Cup.

Summary
The team endured a season of horror, in which the club formerly known as Parma A.C. went into bankruptcy in the middle of the season, seeing out the season in order to avoid the chaos it would cause to the league pyramid. The reason for the bankruptcy was the financial fraud of its owner Calisto Tanzi, who had embezzled money from his company Parmalat, which also went out of business. On 28 June 2004 the club was reformed under its original name as Parma F.C., and finished fifth in the standings. Its glory days were over, however, and the club was forced to sell several key players in the summer of 2004, among them Hidetoshi Nakata, Matteo Ferrari and Matteo Brighi. However, its two most noted players, goalkeeper Sébastien Frey and top scorer and youngster Alberto Gilardino remained with the club, since it did not receive good enough offers to part with the two players.

The season was also the last in which Parma wore its distinctive blue and yellow colours at home, those being associated with Parmalat's ownership. From the 2004–05 season onwards the club reverted to its original white shirt with a black cross design. Club legend Antonio Benarrivo finished his career following the season, being the last player from the 1999 UEFA Cup winning team to leave.

Players

Squad information
Squad at end of season

Transfers

Winter

Competitions

Serie A

League table

Results summary

Results by round

Matches

Coppa Italia

Round of 16

Quarter-finals

UEFA Cup

First round

Second round

Third round

Statistics

Players statistics

Goalscorers

Last updated: 16 May 2004

References

Parma Calcio 1913 seasons
Parma